Kingdomcity is a non-denominational, multi-site Christian church in multiple locations around the world. Originally based in Kuala Lumpur, Malaysia, before it expanded to Perth in Western Australia, Kingdomcity now also has locations in Africa, the Middle East, Europe, and many other nations in Asia.

Founded by senior leader, Mark Varughese, to “connect, equip and empower people to bring the reality of God to their world,” Kingdomcity sets a significant emphasis on relational connection, spiritual hunger, and the daily empowerment of each believer. 

It has a large presence in Perth, Western Australia, and is a member of the Australian Christian Churches (also known as ACC, the Australian branch of the Assemblies of God).

History
In 2006, Mark Varughese had a profound “burning-bush experience” which led to his move from Perth, Western Australia to Kuala Lumpur, Malaysia to plant a church.

After two and a half years in Malaysia, he received an invitation to return to Perth to pastor another church concurrently. This move led to the birth of ‘Kingdomcity’ – with both congregations unified under one name. This was a declaration of their mandate, and a representation of the responsibility of every believer, to bring God’s Kingdom to every city.

Organisation

Senior Leaders 
Mark Varughese and Jemima Varughese are the Senior Leaders of Kingdomcity. In 2021, Mark Varughese published a book titled ‘Ready, Fire! Aim: The Outrageous Adventure of Saying 'Yes' to God’ - detailing the Kingdomcity story and encouraging believers to step out into their own God-given destiny.

Together, “Pastors Mark and Jemima embody the global force Kingdomcity has become through their humility, purity of heart, unbridled passion, and contagious faith... transcending culture, geographical boundaries, and socio-economic environments”, as esteemed by Dominic Russo, founder of Missions.Me and 1Nation1Day.

Team 
With a growing team of Lead Pastors, committed staff and strategic leaders in multiple nations, Kingdomcity is quickly expanding into a global movement. Now with seeds now in Africa, the Middle East, Europe, Asia and Australia in first world and developing world settings.

Locations 
As of 2021, Kingdomcity operates in 25 locations across 14 countries and is a growing global community of over 30,000 people, within just fifteen years.

Timeline 
2006 - Kuala Lumpur  

2009 - Perth  

2014 - Cambodia  

2015 - Singapore  

2016 - Botswana  

2017 - Dubai  

2018 - London  

2019 - Indonesia (Bali and Surabaya), Zambia, Sri Lanka  

2020 - Online Campus; South Africa (Johannesburg), India  

2021 - New Zealand (Auckland), Mexico City (Mexico)

Beliefs 
The core values of Kingdomcity are what they call ‘Atmospheres’. These 10 atmospheres aim to guide each person's disposition towards God, one another, and the wider community. 

 Accepting of all people  
 Relevant to our city  
 Authentic in our lifestyle  
 Prayerful as our priority  
 Hungry for God above all  

 Faith-filled for the miraculous  
 Honouring as our culture  
 Encouraging in our speech  
 Generous with our lives  
 Reaching our world

Music 
Kingdomcity produces contemporary Christian praise and worship. With Kingdomcity youth and Kingedomcity Kids having their own original songs too, there is music for the whole family. Kingdomcity recorded their first original album in 2020 and has since released three albums: ‘Hope’, ‘Place of Worship’ and ‘In God We Trust’. Kingdomcity Music can be streamed from Spotify, Apple Music, YouTube and Amazon Music.

Ministries

Kingdomcity Kids 
As a church, Kingdomcity believes that every child is valuable and that God desires to have a personal relationship with them. Through Kingdomcity Kids, children enjoy a great environment as they get to know God, and many often play a part as volunteers (also called ‘Kids Impactors’) running the service. Full kids services run alongside all adult services, both in-person and online.

Kingdomcity Kids has a growing presence on YouTube, Yipee TV, Facebook and Instagram.

The kids' ministry has produced music, written and recorded by children who are part of the programme. Songs such as “My G.O.D.”, “Saviour of the World” and “You Are Good” - have each brought in over 10,000 plays on a popular music-streaming platform, Spotify. In the past two years, they also have released two EPs: ’You Are Our Father’ and ’Born to Honour’.

Kingdomcity Kids curriculum has also been used widely in schools across Australia and Asia.

Kingdomcity Youth 
Kingdomcity Youth is the youth movement of Kingdomcity, with the mission of connecting, equipping and empowering teenagers to bring the reality of God to their world. Kingdomcity Youth has released an eleven track album in 2022 and their first single "Undignified" in early 2022 as well. All of these tracks reaching in almost over 20,000 streams in Spotify alone. The Kingdomcity Youth ministry consists of two groups called 'Saints' for ages 13-17 and 'Warriors' for ages 10-12. It is a space for teenagers to encounter Jesus and be discipled, all while having fun and building encouraging, Godly relationships. 

Kingdomcity Youth has a growing presence on YouTube, Facebook and Instagram.

Kingdomcity Greenhouse 
Kingdomcity Greenhouse is a two-year programme for all ages to experience an acceleration of spiritual growth through discipleship, leadership, and practical ministry training. Previously known as “Kingdomcity Leadership Academy”, the rebranding to ‘Greenhouse’ symbolises a deliberately constructed environment and intentionally created atmosphere, in which life can thrive despite any external extremes.

· 1st Year – Potter's Hand 
The first year of Greenhouse is aimed at investing in each individual’s discipleship journey. The programme has been designed to take a holistic approach of equipping; through training, relational engagement with others, God-encounters, and the experience of new environments.

· 2nd Year – Refiner's Fire 
The second year of training is specifically designed to refine the ministry and leadership acumen of students. Building on the foundation of the first year, with four streams taught by experienced leaders, teachers and pastors, this is a year dedicated to raising leaders who are trained, equipped, and ready to be sent to the nations.

Kingdomcity Greenroom 
Greenroom is an online, subscription-based video platform, featuring exclusive Kingdomcity content, launched in 2020. With hundreds of high-quality, Bible-based videos, courses, and resources. Including tailor-made kid’s content, exclusive leadership resources, behind-the-scenes training and world-renowned speakers and leaders.

The Greenroom platform features eight rooms of exclusive content, with over a hundred video courses and sermons recorded from global events. 

 Library
 Pastors Roundtable
 Encounter Room
 Leaders Lounge
 Beautiful Corner
 Kids Backyard
 Guest Room
 The Kitchen

COVID-19 pandemic 
In 2020, during the coronavirus pandemic, Kingdomcity saw dramatic growth in church numbers amidst the tragedy happening in the world. 

Over just one weekend, all Kingdomcity services were shifted online. This sparked the birth of the Kingdomcity Media studio. Since then, hundreds of services, prayer nights, worship sessions and more have been live-streamed worldwide.

Media Coverage 
Mark Varughese, Jemima Varughese, the Kingdomcity team and their various ministries have been featured on television, radio, news, and online platforms; including the Hillsong Channel, Planetshakers Podcast, The Art of Success Podcast with Daniel Budzinski, Asian Beacon, Yipee TV, and more.

See also 

Christianity in Malaysia
New Apostolic Reformation
Pentecostalism
Worship service (evangelicalism)

References

External links
Kingdomcity Official Website

Protestantism in Malaysia
Charismatic denominations
Charismatic and Pentecostal Christianity
Churches in Kuala Lumpur